Kaltandar-e Sofla (also Romanized as Kaltandar-e Soflá, Kaltondar-e Soflá, and Kaltondar Soflá; also known as Kaltondar-e Pā’īn) is a village in Qaleh Tall Rural District, in the Central District of Bagh-e Malek County, Khuzestan Province, Iran. At the 2006 census, its population was 249, in 62 families.

References 

Populated places in Bagh-e Malek County